Vice Adm. Phillip Monroe Balisle (born 1948) a native of Idabel, Oklahoma, was commissioned in the United States Navy in 1970 after graduating from Oklahoma State University. At sea, he commanded the destroyer , the cruiser  and the  Battle Group.   He served as Director, Surface Warfare Division (OPNAV N76) on the Chief of Naval Operations staff at the Pentagon.

Balisle assumed command of Naval Sea Systems Command (NAVSEA) 28 June 2002, where he previously served as vice commander.

Balisle has received the Distinguished Service Medal, five awards of the Legion of Merit, seven Meritorious Service Medals and the Bronze Star Medal.

After retiring from the Navy, Balisle took a role as executive vice president of DRS Technologies, Inc.

References

External links

1948 births
Living people
People from Idabel, Oklahoma
Oklahoma State University alumni
Naval Postgraduate School alumni
Recipients of the Meritorious Service Medal (United States)
Recipients of the Legion of Merit
United States Navy vice admirals
NAVSEA commanders
Recipients of the Navy Distinguished Service Medal